Diary of a Wimpy Kid: Double Down is the eleventh book in the Diary of a Wimpy Kid series by Jeff Kinney. The book was unveiled during the 2016 Diary of a Wimpy Kid Virtually Live Event. The book was published on November 1, 2016. The book's trailer was released on October 17, 2016. The book garnered mixed to positive reviews, with critics noting the dip in quality since The Ugly Truth. However, the series would go back to its usual critical acclaim in The Getaway.

Plot
Greg Heffley talks about how he thinks his life is a reality TV show and that everyone in his life is an actor. Later, when his mother, Susan, gives him money for the school book fair, she is disappointed when he buys toys instead of books and believes that Greg can discover new creative talents. Greg doubts this, recalling times he tried writing poems and failed an advanced placement test. He returns to the book fair to buy Spineticklers horror books, which reminds him of Halloween approaching.

Wanting Halloween candy, Greg enters a contest at school in which students release balloons with letters attached, and the student whose balloon goes the farthest wins a jar of candy corn. Most of the balloons released crash into a brand new radio tower, but Greg's balloon rises slower due to his heavy letter and continues on. As Greg and his mother formulate a new reading list, his balloon is found by a boy named Maddox, whom Susan finds to be a good role model for him. During a playdate at Maddox's house, Greg retrieves his balloon, and realizes that Maddox is not allowed to use electronics and spends his time playing with Legos. Maddox accuses Greg of having stolen one of his Legos (one of the tiny useless blocks, which stuck to Greg's arm without him noticing, which results in his mother frisking Greg), and Susan ends the playdate in disappointment. At school, Greg turns in his balloon and wins the candy corn, which is discovered and eaten by the family's pet pig.

Greg joins the school band in order to get invited to a Halloween party. He settles for a French horn, but realizes that he will not be invited due to not playing a woodwind instrument. Greg goes with his friend Rowley, who plays the flute and is invited, as a two-headed monster. Susan attends the party and sets up party games, which all the attendees enjoy. After the party, Greg loses interest in playing the French horn, but is made to play in a school concert by his father Frank. He is accidentally locked in the band room, and gets grounded as punishment (after Frank mistakenly thinks he wasted time by not playing in the concert).

At home, Greg finds an off-limits bag of chocolate chips and realizes that he will get in trouble after eating them. He calls Rowley and asks him to bring over chocolate chips, but they melt and leave a mess. While going to get paper towels, he finds gummy worms and comes up with the idea to make a horror movie.

Greg and Rowley write and film the opening of the movie. After Greg spreads gummy worms in the yard for a scene, he sees the pig eating the gummy worms in the house. Rowley notices a flock of geese in the yard. To scare them off, Greg and Rowley retrieve a Halloween wolf mask from the basement, but the duo accidentally set off a noisy plastic witch mentioned earlier in the book, and the cabinet falls on top of them after Rowley gets startled. Rowley sprints out of the house and climbs up a tree, and Greg's dad arrives home. Days later, while Greg is forced by Frank to sort and clean the cabinet that fell, Rowley gains fame from the local news after the movie-making incident, to Greg's annoyance and the rejection of any statements that he had made at the beginning of the book regarding fame.

Development
In an interview, Kinney stated, "After the 10th book, I found myself at a crossroads in my career. I wasn’t sure if I should continue writing Diary of a Wimpy Kid books or go down a different path. Double Down is really special to me, because it reflects a renewed commitment to the series and a plan for the future."

Reception
Rachel Chipman of the Deseret News wrote that the book would "probably not attract any new fans", while longtime fans of the Diary of a Wimpy Kid series would "adore [Greg's] Halloween middle school adventures". Carrie R. Wheadon of Common Sense Media wrote that "when Kinney sticks to his Halloween theme, the story feels fresh and holds together well. When he veers to strange flashbacks about piano lessons and speech class, it feels more like filler." A Booklist review states, "though Greg’s clever ideas backfire more often than not, this just fuels the fun. Readers are definitely in for a treat with Kinney’s latest." However, many fans of the series criticized Double Down for having an inconsistent plot, and the advertised movie-making plot not happening until the end.

Sales
The book topped USA Today'''s bestselling books list 8 days after publication. It was the 11th book in the Diary of a Wimpy Kid series to do so. Double Down'' was the second-best print bestseller of 2016, having sold 1,135,249 copies.

References

2016 American novels
2016 children's books
American children's novels
Diary of a Wimpy Kid
Novels by Jeff Kinney
Amulet Books books